The Chester Castaways are a Junior C ice hockey team based in Chester, Nova Scotia, Canada. This franchise was established in 2019 returning the city to the Nova Scotia Regional Junior Hockey League. The previous franchise began in 2008 as the Chester Clippers before relocating to Sydney, where they played as the Northside Vics. The Vics only lasted one season before folding, however they did not participate in the 2013-14 season. The team played in the Nova Scotia Junior C Hockey League.

History

The team was founded in 2008 by Jehad Assaff and a group of volunteers from Chester, Nova Scotia, before being sold to a North Sydney group headed by Jordan Evasuk-MacDonald in July 2013.

On September 13, 2008, the team showed that Chester could compete at the Junior C level by playing their first ever exhibition game and beat the Liverpool-based South Shore Wild by a score of 4–3. Tyler Arsenault opened up the scoring for Chester at 4:54 in the first period, Kyle Young and Chad Jollimore scored the second and third goal respectively. Bryce Andersen netted the game-winner at 16:28 of the 3rd period. This marked the first ever franchise win for Chester.

The Chester Clippers won the 2009–10 Ice Dogs Early Bird Pre-season Tournament with a 6–3 win over the Eastern Shore Jr. Mariners in the final game on September 27, 2009.

The Clippers continue to move in the right direction as they set many new league and franchise records in 2010–11. The Chester Clippers set new league regular season records for most goals scored (278) and fewest goals against (55), while setting a new franchise record for most wins in a season with 28.

In 2010-11, Clippers forward Justin Norris broke the league's scoring record by reaching 119 points in 29 games. While, defenseman Jordan Kenny set a new league record for points by a defender with 59 pts in 25 games. Justin Norris was selected as the Nova Scotia Jr. C Hockey League's Most Valuable Player in both the regular season and playoffs. Goaltender Alex Mader won the statistical award for Top Goals-against-average (GAA), posting a league-best 1.93 GAA during the regular season.

Fans witnessed more history in 2011–12, as the Clippers became the first team in league history to go undefeated in the regular season (28-0). The Chester squad went 11–1 in the playoffs to win their first provincial championship and then went on to win the Maritime-Hockey North Junior C Championships.

In 2012-13, the Chester Clippers finished with 25 wins and 3 losses to capture their third consecutive regular season championship. Chester then went on to defeat Fundy (Quarter-finals), Shannon (Semi-finals), and Barrington (Finals) to win their second straight Nova Scotia Junior C Hockey League and provincial championship. The Clippers went 2-2 in the round-robin portion of the 2013 Maritime-Hockey North Junior C Championships and finished 4th out of 5 teams, to advance to the semi-finals, where they suffered a heart-breaking 5–4 loss to the eventual tournament champions, Hampton Hurricanes.

On Monday July 22, 2013, the Nova Scotia Junior "C" Hockey League's Board of Governors approved the transfer and relocation of the defending champion Clippers to a group based in Industrial Cape Breton.
 
The Clippers were scheduled to play out of Bedford this upcoming season, after relocating from Chester in June, however after numerous attempts the Bedford situation could not work out in the best interests of the club and the league. As of the 2013–14 season, the franchise would be known as the Northside Vics.  The Northside Vics or Victorias is common hockey club name in the area historically, including a Junior A club by that name in the 1970s Eastern Junior A Hockey League.

Junior C hockey returned to Chester with the Chester Castaways joining the Nova Scotia Regional Hockey League for the 2019-20 season, where they went to the league finals in their 1st season in Chester, eventually falling to old time rivals Eastern Shore in 4 straight games.

Championships

Maritime-Hockey North Junior C Championships: 1 (2011–12)

Nova Scotia Junior C Hockey League League Championships: 2 (2011–12, 2012–13)

Nova Scotia Junior C Hockey League Division Championships: 2 (2010–11, 2011–12)

Nova Scotia Junior C Hockey League Regular Season Championships: 3 (2010–11, 2011–12, 2012–13)

Nova Scotia Junior C Hockey League Pre-Season Championships: 3 (2009–10, 2011–12, 2012–13)

Yearly results
Legend: GP = Games Played, W = Wins, L = Losses, OTL = Overtime Loss, SL = Shootout Loss, PTS = Points

References

External links
 Chester Clippers Instagram page
  Chester Clippers Website
 Official NSJRCHL Website

Ice hockey teams in Nova Scotia
2008 establishments in Nova Scotia
2014 disestablishments in Nova Scotia
Ice hockey clubs established in 2008
Ice hockey clubs disestablished in 2014
Cape Breton County